The 2004 Milan–San Remo cycling race was the 95th edition of the monument classic Milan–San Remo and was won for the first time by Spaniard Óscar Freire of . It was held on 20 March 2004 over 294 kilometres. Four times winner Erik Zabel lifted his arms to celebrate too soon and Freire won by 3 centimeters by a bike throw at the line.

Results

External links
Results

2004
March 2004 sports events in Europe
2004 in Italian sport
Milan-San Remo
2004 in road cycling